Will Kerr (born October 21, 1982) is a retired American mixed martial artist. A professional competitor from 2005 until 2010, he competed for World Extreme Cagefighting.

Mixed martial arts career

World Extreme Cagefighting
Kerr made his WEC debut against Kamal Shalorus in November 2009 at WEC 44, replacing an injured Alex Karalexis, where he lost via TKO in the first round.

Kerr then faced Karen Darabedyan on June 20, 2010, at WEC 49.  He won the fight via submission (armbar) in the first round.

Kerr faced Danny Castillo on December 16, 2010, at WEC 53.  He lost the fight via KO in the first round.

Mixed martial arts record

|-
|Loss
|align=center|9–3
|Danny Castillo
|KO (punches)
|WEC 53
|
|align=center|1
|align=center|1:25
|Glendale, Arizona, United States
|
|-
|Win
|align=center|9–2
|Karen Darabedyan
|Submission (armbar)
|WEC 49
|
|align=center|1
|align=center|1:20
|Edmonton, Alberta, Canada
|
|-
|Loss
|align=center|8–2
|Kamal Shalorus
|TKO (punches)
|WEC 44
|
|align=center|1
|align=center|1:26
|Las Vegas, Nevada, United States
|
|-
|Win
|align=center|8–1
|Pete Jeffrey
|Submission (rear-naked choke)
|FFP: Untamed 29
|
|align=center|2
|align=center|2:23
|Marlborough, Massachusetts, United States
|Defended the FPP Lightweight Championship.
|-
|Win
|align=center|7–1
|Marc Stevens
|Decision (unanimous)
|FFP: Untamed 23
|
|align=center|3
|align=center|5:00
|Foxborough, Massachusetts, United States
|Defended the FPP Lightweight Championship.
|-
|Win
|align=center|6–1
|Douglas Brown
|Submission (heel hook)   
|FFP: Untamed 19
|
|align=center|1
|align=center|2:54 
|Plymouth, Massachusetts, United States
|Defended the FPP Lightweight Championship.
|-
|Win
|align=center|5–1 
|Matt Perry
|TKO (punches)
|FFP: Untamed 16
|
|align=center|3
|align=center|2:00
|Westport, Massachusetts, United States
|Defended the FPP Lightweight Championship.
|-
|Win
|align=center|4–1
|Jack Wilmarth
|Submission (toe hold)
|FFP: Untamed 13
|
|align=center|1
|align=center|3:59
|Mansfield, Massachusetts, United States
|Won the vacant FPP Lightweight Championship.
|-
|Loss
|align=center|3–1
|Ian Loveland
|Submission (guillotine choke)
|Ring of Combat 12
|
|align=center|1
|align=center|2:22
|Atlantic City, New Jersey, United States
|
|-
|Win
|align=center|3–0 
|Joao Amaral
|Decision (split)
|Combat Zone 15: Marked Men 
|
|align=center|2
|align=center|4:00
|Revere, Massachusetts, United States
|
|-
|Win
|align=center|2–0
|Nick Luongo
|Decision (unanimous)
|FFP: Untamed 3
|
|align=center|2
|align=center|5:00
|Brockton, Massachusetts, United States
|
|-
|Win
|align=center|1–0
|Cesario de Souza
|KO (punches)
|East Coast Fighting Alliance: The Colosseum 
|
|align=center|1
|
|Worcester, Massachusetts, United States
|
|-

References

External links 

1982 births
American male mixed martial artists
American practitioners of Brazilian jiu-jitsu
Mixed martial artists from Connecticut
Lightweight mixed martial artists
Mixed martial artists utilizing Brazilian jiu-jitsu
Living people